Jim Lovette was a college football player and record-setting quarterback for the Samford Bulldogs football team. He was from Red Bay, Alabama.

References

American football quarterbacks
Samford Bulldogs football players
Players of American football from Alabama